Bankrishnapur  is a village in Chanditala I community development block of Srirampore subdivision in Hooghly district in the Indian state of West Bengal.

Geography

Gram panchayat

Villages and census towns in Gangadharpur gram panchayat are: Bankrishnapur, Gangadharpur, Malipukur and Manirampur.

Market: Ganngadharpur Bazar, Hajaghata, Manirampur.

Demographics
As per 2011 Census of India, Bankrishnapur had a total population of 1,610 of which 867 (54%) were males and 743 (46%) were females. Population below 6 years was 176. The total number of literates in Bankrishnapur was 1,226 (85.50% of the population over 6 years).

Transport
The nearest railway station is Baruipara railway station
on the Howrah-Bardhaman chord line, which is a part of the Kolkata Suburban Railway system.

The main road is Gangadharpur-Jangalpara Road; it is connected to State Highway 15. There is auto and trecker service from Baruipara to Masat via Gangadharpur , Bankrishnapur.

References 

Villages in Chanditala I CD Block